Tenaya (died 1853) was a leader of the Ahwahnechee people in Yosemite Valley, California.

Background
Tenaya's father was a leader of the Ahwahnechee people (or Awahnichi).  The Ahwahneechee had become a tribe distinct from the other tribes in the area. Lafayette Bunnell, the doctor of the Mariposa Battalion, wrote that "Ten-ie-ya was recognized, by the Mono tribe, as one of their number, as he was born and lived among them until his ambition made him a leader and founder of the Paiute colony in Ah-wah-ne."

The Ahwahneechee occupied Yosemite Valley until a sickness destroyed most of them.
The few Ahwahneechee left Yosemite Valley and joined the Mono Lake Paiutes in the eastern Sierra Nevada. Tenaya's father married a Mono Paiute woman and Tenaya was born from that union. Tenaya grew up amongst his mother's people.

Leadership
An Ahwahneechee medicine man and friend of his Father persuaded a young Tenaya to return.  Tenaya took the few remnants of the Ah-wah-nee-chees that had been living with the Monos and Paiutes and reestablished themselves in Yosemite Valley with him as their leader. Tenaya had four wives.

The Ahwahneechee were feared by the surrounding Miwok tribes, who called them yohhe'meti, meaning "they are killers"

By 1851, conflicts between the non-indigenous miners and the Native Americans in the Sierra started to increase. The state of California decided to send the Natives to reservations. The Mariposa Battalion was formed to carry out the relocation, marching Tenaya and his people to the Fresno Reservation. Many of Tenaya's band left Yosemite Valley instead of following Tenaya. As they approached the Fresno reservation, they fled back to the Yosemite Valley. The Brigade then re-entered the Valley, captured Tenaya's sons, and killed his youngest son. Tenaya then agreed to go back to the reservation.

Death

By the summer of 1851, Tenaya grew tired of the reservation. He gave his pledge that he would not disturb any non-indigenous people. However, in 1852, a group of prospectors were killed in the Valley. Tenaya and his band fled to join the Mono Paiutes. He returned to the Valley in 1853. He was stoned to death in a dispute with the Mono Paiutes over stolen horses. The remaining survivors who were not killed were taken back to Mono Lake and absorbed into the Mono Lake Paiute population.

Another version of the story says that in the spring of 1852, a party of eight prospectors entered the Valley. One of the prospectors had lured his comrades there to kill them and take possession of a mine they held in partnership. He had incited the Yosemites to kill the intruders, arranging his escape and letting the blame fall on them.  Late in the summer of 1853, Tenaya and some of the men of his band were playing a hand bone game with some Mono Indians. The gambling became tense and a fight broke out which ended with Tenaya being struck in the head with a rock crushing his skull along with several others of his band killed as well. As was their custom, they were cremated and wailing was heard for two weeks. After the death of their leader, the few remaining members dispersed  between Mono Lake and to the near west.

Legacy
Tenaya Lake was named after Tenaya. Tenaya Middle Schools in Fresno, California and Merced, California are named after him. An elementary school in Groveland, California is also named after Chief Tenaya.

See also
 History of the Yosemite area

References

External links
 The Yosemite Indians
 Discovery of the Yosemite by Lafayette Bunnell
 The Last Survivor by H. J. Taylor contains an account of the last survivor of Tenaya's original tribe.
 1910 Miwok tribal area map Map of Miwok territory by noted California Anthropologist C. Hart Merriam.
 Historic Yosemite Indian chiefs - with photos

Native American leaders
History of the Sierra Nevada (United States)
Yosemite National Park
Mono tribe
Paiute people
1853 deaths
Year of birth unknown
Deaths by stoning